KWS was a British dance act from Nottingham, England consisting of instrumentalists/record producers Chris King and Winston "Winnie" Williams, and vocalist Delroy St. Joseph. The band's name is an initialism of the members' surnames, King/Williams/St. Joseph.

Chart history
They had a number one single on the UK Singles Chart with the double A-side "Please Don't Go" / "Game Boy".

They were subsequently nominated for the Best British Newcomer award at the BRIT Awards in 1993.

Keyboard player Chris King appeared on Never Mind the Buzzcocks in the Identity Parade round. It was revealed he is now working as a classic scooter renovator.

Discography

Studio albums

Singles

References

English pop music groups
English dance music groups
British musical trios
Musical groups from Nottingham